Sutton Maddock is a civil parish in Shropshire, England.  It contains six listed buildings that are recorded in the National Heritage List for England.  Of these, one is listed at Grade II*, the middle of the three grades, and the others are at Grade II, the lowest grade.  The parish contains the settlements of Sutton Maddock and Brockton, and is otherwise rural.  The listed buildings consist of houses and a church.


Key

Buildings

References

Citations

Sources

Lists of buildings and structures in Shropshire